Taylorville is an unincorporated community in Cardston County, Alberta, Canada. It is located on Highway 501 ten miles southeast of Cardston.  The first school opened May 17, 1900 and then later served as a chapel for the Church of Jesus Christ of Latter-day Saints (LDS Church).

See also 
 List of provincial historic sites of Alberta
 List of communities in Alberta

References

External links 
History of Taylorville
Taylorville Its History and People

Latter-day Saint settlements in Canada
Localities in Cardston County